The 1982 Newfoundland general election was held on 6 April 1982 to elect members of the 39th General Assembly of Newfoundland. It was won by the Progressive Conservative party.

Results

Members elected
For complete electoral history, see individual districts

References
 Election Report

Further reading
 

1982
1982 elections in Canada
1982 in Newfoundland and Labrador
April 1982 events in Canada